The yellow-bellied wattle-eye (Platysteira concreta) is a species of bird in the family Platysteiridae.
It is found in Angola, Burundi, Cameroon, Central African Republic, Republic of the Congo, Democratic Republic of the Congo, Ivory Coast, Equatorial Guinea, Gabon, Ghana, Guinea, Kenya, Liberia, Nigeria, Rwanda, Sierra Leone, Tanzania, and Uganda.
Its natural habitats are subtropical or tropical moist lowland forests and subtropical or tropical moist montane forests.

References

yellow-bellied wattle-eye
Birds of Central Africa
Birds of West Africa
yellow-bellied wattle-eye
Taxonomy articles created by Polbot
Taxobox binomials not recognized by IUCN